Caz Walton OBE (born Carol Bryant; 1 February 1947) is a British retired wheelchair athlete and former Great Britain Paralympic team manager. She was a multi-disciplinary gold medallist who competed in numerous Paralympic Games. Between 1964 and 1976 she won medals in athletics, swimming, table tennis, and fencing. She took a break from the Paralympics, entering the basketball and fencing competitions in 1988. In total Walton won ten gold medals during her Paralympic career, making her one of the most successful British athletes of all time. Walton should also have been awarded gold in the 1968 Tel Aviv Women's Pentathlon incomplete but, due to a miscalculation of her total score which went unnoticed at the time, she was given third place and a bronze medal.

Sporting career
Walton enjoyed a lengthy competitive career, winning medals in European, Commonwealth, and World Championships. She competed in a wide range of events, including athletics, table tennis, swimming, fencing, and basketball.

Paralympics
Walton began her Paralympic career at the 1964 Summer Paralympics in Tokyo. She took part in two athletics events, the slalom and the wheelchair dash, winning gold in both. At the 1968 Games in Tel Aviv Walton competed in numerous track and field disciplines, the breaststroke and backstroke in swimming, and singles and doubles in table tennis. She won at least a silver medal in all three areas, finishing the Games with six medals three of which were gold.

Walton's most successful Paralympics was the 1972 Games in Heidelberg. She won two gold and one bronze medal in the athletics events and gold in the table tennis singles. She entered the fencing event rather than the swimming, winning the novice foil individual event. At the 1976 Games in Toronto Watson entered similar events, winning bronze in athletics, table tennis, and fencing.

For the 1988 Summer Paralympics in Seoul, Walton opted to compete in the wheelchair basketball and fencing events. Great Britain did not progress beyond the preliminaries of the basketball having lost all four matches, but Watson achieved what would be her final medal when she won gold in the épée individual 4–6. This took her total to ten Paralympic gold medals.

Walton retired from international competitions in 1994. She became the manager of Great Britain's Paralympic fencing team in 1996, reprising the role for the Games of 2000 and 2008. For the 2004 Games she was the team administrator for Great Britain.

Awards and accolades
In 1970 Walton received the Bill McGowran Trophy for Disabled Sports Personality of the Year from the Sports Journalists' Association. She was appointed an Officer of the Order of the British Empire (OBE) in the 2010 Birthday Honours for her services to disability sport.

References

External links
The history of the Paralympics – photograph of Carol Bryant in winning a gold medal 1964

1947 births
Living people
British female wheelchair racers
British female fencers
British female swimmers
British female table tennis players
Officers of the Order of the British Empire
Paralympic swimmers of Great Britain
Paralympic gold medalists for Great Britain
Paralympic silver medalists for Great Britain
Paralympic bronze medalists for Great Britain
Paralympic table tennis players of Great Britain
Paralympic athletes of Great Britain
Medalists at the 1964 Summer Paralympics
Medalists at the 1968 Summer Paralympics
Medalists at the 1972 Summer Paralympics
Medalists at the 1976 Summer Paralympics
Medalists at the 1988 Summer Paralympics
Athletes (track and field) at the 1964 Summer Paralympics
Athletes (track and field) at the 1968 Summer Paralympics
Athletes (track and field) at the 1972 Summer Paralympics
Athletes (track and field) at the 1976 Summer Paralympics
Table tennis players at the 1968 Summer Paralympics
Table tennis players at the 1972 Summer Paralympics
Swimmers at the 1968 Summer Paralympics
Swimmers at the 1976 Summer Paralympics
Wheelchair fencers at the 1972 Summer Paralympics
Wheelchair fencers at the 1976 Summer Paralympics
Wheelchair fencers at the 1988 Summer Paralympics
Wheelchair basketball players at the 1988 Summer Paralympics
Recipients of the Sunday Times Sportswomen of the Year Lifetime Achievement Award
Paralympic medalists in athletics (track and field)
Paralympic medalists in table tennis
Paralympic medalists in swimming
Paralympic medalists in wheelchair fencing